The Hum Award for Best Supporting Actor is an award presented annually by the Hum Television Network and Entertainment Channel (HTNEC). It is given in honor of an actor who has delivered an outstanding performance in a supporting role while working within the television industry. The 1st Hum Awards (for 2012) was held in 2013, Mohib Mirza was the first winner of the award for his role in Shehr-e-Zaat. The award has commonly been referred to as the hum for Best Supporting Actor. Currently, nominees are determined by single transferable vote, within the actors and jury branch of HTNEC; winners are selected by a plurality vote from the entire eligible voting members of the Hum. Multiple nominations for an actor in same category but for different work is eligible.

Since its inception, the award has been awarded to three actors, While Rehan Sheikh has received the most nominations than any other actor with two. As of 2015 ceremony, Rehan Sheikh is the most recent winner in this category for his role as Amin in Sadqay Tumhare.

Winners and nominees
In the list below, winners are listed first in the colored row, followed by the other nominees. Following the hum's practice, the dramas below are listed by year of their Pakistan qualifying run, which is usually (but not always) the drama's year of release.

For the first ceremony, the eligibility period spanned full calendar years. For example, the 1st Hum Awards presented on April 28, 2013, to recognized supporting actors of dramas that were released between January, 2012, and December, 2012, the period of eligibility is the full previous calendar year from January 1 to December 31.  However, this rule was subjected to change when at third year ceremony two (Sadqay Tumhare and Digest Writer) of seven nominated drama serials were running on TV at the time when nominations were announced. Date and the award ceremony shows that the 2010 is the period from 2010-2020 (10 years-decade), while the year above winners and nominees shows that the dramas year in which they were telecast, and the figure in bracket shows the ceremony number, for example; an award ceremony is held for the dramas of its previous year.

See also 
 Hum Awards
 Hum Awards pre-show
 List of Hum Awards Ceremonies

References

External links
Official websites
 Hum Awards official website
 Hum Television Network and Entertainment Channel (HTNEC)
 Hum's Channel at YouTube (run by the Hum Television Network and Entertainment Channel)
 Hum Awards at Facebook (run by the Hum Television Network and Entertainment Channel)]

Hum Awards
Hum Award winners
Hum TV
Hum Network Limited